Justine Stafford is an Irish comedian, writer, podcaster and television presenter.

Early and personal life
From Kilbeg, just outside Nobber, in County Meath, Ireland. Stafford grew up on a farm. She has one brother, called Lorcán. She attended Kilbeg National School where she was introduced to a short-film project for primary schools called Fis Films for which she won a national prize in Dublin. She began making her own comedy films after receiving a Camcorder the following Christmas, aged 11. From 13 Stafford suffered from anorexia and around this time won an award at Ireland’s Youth Film Festival called Fresh Films, held in Limerick. Stafford subsequently was the Irish representative taking her winning short film to an international youth film festival held in South Korea. In March, 2021 Stafford herself co-hosted the Ireland's Young Filmmaker of the Year Awards online.

Career

On-line
Stafford studied film and broadcasting at the Dublin Institute of Technology after which worked for the radio station FM104 and spent five years at JOE.ie as senior social creative and content creator.  She became a comedic presence on social media, including for posts based on comedically creative Halloween costumes, social commentary, and satire on popular television programmes. Since June 2021 Stafford has co-hosted, with Martin Angelo and Dermot Ward, the podcast The Substantial Meal. With shows available online as well as performed at live events and festivals, Stafford described the format as “three friends recreating the atmosphere of being in a pub by sharing embarrassing stories, giving life advice and solving the world's big problems.”

Film & Television
In 2019 Stafford was a finalist in Irish TV's Stand Up And Be Funny competition. In 2021 Stafford co-hosted television food game show Battle of the Food Trucks with Gary Patrice on RTE Player. The series was renewed for a second season that aired in 2022. In 2021 Stafford also had a role in Irish film The Poster Boys, starring Keith Duffy, amongst others. In 2022 Stafford appeared on RTÉ 2 series No Worries If Not! The series was, according to RTÉ director of content Jim Jennings, “a vehicle for young comedy talent”, with a sketch comedy format that may have been enhanced, Stafford noted, by the Covid-19 pandemic that had “created a rich period for the phenomenon of the online comedy video”. Stafford also appeared on both series of RTÉ player comedy series Darren & Joe's Free Gaff in 2021 and 2022.

In February 2023 Stafford appeared on a Valentine’s Day special edition of the Late Late Show and added “an honestly impressive and possibly Guinness Book of Records-worthy number of innuendoes into such a brief window”, and “salty double-entendres”.

References

Living people
People from County Meath
Actors from County Meath
Irish stand-up comedians
Irish comedy writers
Irish humorists
Irish satirists
Irish television writers
Irish actresses
21st-century Irish actresses
Irish women podcasters
Irish women television presenters
Irish women comedians
21st-century Irish women writers
Women television writers
Year of birth missing (living people)